Bethal is a farming town in Mpumalanga, South Africa. The farms in the region produce maize, sunflower seeds, sorghum, rye and potatoes.

History
The town originated on an old farm called Blesbokspruit. The town, established in on 12 October 1880, was named after the combined names of the wives of the owners of the farm, Elizabeth du Plooy and Alida Naude. It became a municipality in 1921.

Economy

Agriculture
Bethal is famous for its potato industry, and the annual National Potato Festival was held there in early May, but discontinued in 2007. Other agriculture includes maize, sunflower seeds, sorghum, rye, oats and barley. Animal husbandry includes cattle, dairy and sheep farming. Bethal was once the headquarters of AFGRI, and agricultural firm, now based in Centurion but its flour mill remains in the town.

Mining
Bethal lies in South Africa's coal mining region and there are mines close by. Exxaro acquired the Total Coal South Africa in 2014 and has five mines in the area. Apart from exports, the coal is used in the Eskom power stations that dot the region.

Geography
The Olifants River has its origin near Bethal. The river eventually flows into the Limpopo River in Mozambique.

Climate

Law and government
Bethal lies in the Govan Mbeki Local Municipality (formerly Highveld East Local Municipality) situated in the Gert Sibande District, of Mpumalanga. Secunda is the seat of the municipality.

Infrastructure

Roads
Bethal is the crossroads of three main roads. R38 leads out north-east of the town to Carolina and south-west to the town of Standerton. The N17 West connects the town to the southern suburbs of Johannesburg and N17 east to Ermelo and Eswatini.

Notable people
Andries Coetzee – South Africa national rugby team player
Llewellyn Herbert – 2000 Summer Olympics 400 metres hurdles bronze medal winner
Basil Hirschowitz – gastroenterologist and inventor
Qedani Mahlangu – Gauteng MEC for Health
Busisiwe Mkhwebane – Public Protector of South Africa
Josia Thugwane – 1996 Summer Olympics marathon gold medal winner. South Africa's first black athlete to win an Olympic gold medal
Riaan Dempers - South African sprinter and former record holder in the 200 meters

References

External links
 Bethal business & service listings
 Bethal information site

Populated places in the Govan Mbeki Local Municipality
Populated places established in 1898